{{Infobox basketball club 
| color1 = #FFFFFF
| color2 = #FF7518
|name = Miami FloridiansThe Floridians
|logo =  Miamifloridians.png
|conference = None
|division = Eastern Division 
|founded = 1967
|history = Minnesota Muskies 1967–1968 Miami Floridians1968–1970The Floridians1970–1972|arena = Miami Beach Convention Hall, Bayfront Center  
|city = Miami, Florida 
|colors = Orange and Blue  (1968–70)  Black, Magenta and Orange     (1970–72)
|coach = Jim Pollard 1968–1969 Jim Pollard & Harold Blitman 1969–1970
| manager = Dennis Murphy
|owner = L.P. Shields & Fred Jefferson 1968–1969 Ned Doyle 1970–1972
}}

The Miami Floridians, later in their history known simply as The Floridians, were a professional basketball franchise in the original, now-defunct American Basketball Association. The Miami Floridians played in the ABA from 1968 through 1970 when they became simply The Floridians. The team had two color schemes: their original red, blue, and white, and their later black, magenta, and orange.

The Miami Floridians began as the Minnesota Muskies, a charter ABA franchise who played in Bloomington, Minnesota at the Met Center and wore blue and gold.  The Muskies finished with the league's second-best record, but wretched attendance figures (officially 2,800 per game, a figure that was likely padded) led owner Larry Shields to conclude that the team could not be viable in the Twin Cities.  He sold minority shares to a group of Florida businessmen and moved the team to Miami.  However, in order to pay leftover debts in Minnesota, Shields sold Rookie of the Year Mel Daniels to the Indiana Pacers, a deal now reckoned as the most lopsided trade in ABA history.

Move to Miami
The Floridians never attracted a large following, despite numerous promotions—including ballgirls wearing white bikinis and go-go boots.   However, the team did manage to make the playoffs three out of the four years of their existence. The Floridians' first homes were the Miami Beach Convention Center and the Convention Center Annex. Coached by former Minneapolis Lakers great Jim Pollard, the 1968–69 season was the most successful for the Miami Floridians by far, finishing their first season in Florida with a 43-35 record and defeating the Minnesota Pipers (who played in the city the Floridians had just abandoned) in the Eastern Division semifinals 4 games to 3, before losing in the divisional finals to the Indiana Pacers 4 games to 1.

The 1969–70 season was largely forgettable for the Miami Floridians. They split their home games between Dinner Key Auditorium and Miami-Dade Junior College North's gym. Dinner Key, a former aircraft hangar, was perhaps the most infamous building in ABA history. It had no air conditioning and would often get quite hot inside, forcing management to throw open the doors; players would then have to adjust their shots by the ocean breezes that whistled onto the court. The Floridians dismissed Pollard during the season and named Hal Blitman of Cheyney State College as their head coach.  The minority partners began taking a greater role in team operations, often trading players without Blitman's knowledge. Not surprisingly given the constant turnover on the roster, the Floridians finished 23-61 and missed the playoffs.  The team's original owners, Shields and Fred Jefferson, sold the Floridians at the end of the season.

The Floridians
Following the 1969–70 season, new owner Ned Doyle dropped "Miami" from the team's name and made it a "regional" franchise, scheduling games in Miami (back at the Miami Beach Convention Center), Tampa-St. Petersburg at the Curtis Hixon Hall and Bayfront Arena, Jacksonville at the Jacksonville Memorial Coliseum, and in West Palm Beach at the West Palm Beach Auditorium. In an unprecedented move, Doyle "fired" the entire team (all players were traded or released) and kept the coach. The team replaced Blitman after an 18-30 start with Bob Bass.  Bass was able to turn the team around and the Floridians finished fourth in the Eastern Division with a record of 37–47. The Floridians made the playoffs, but lost their series to the Kentucky Colonels, 4–2.

For the 1971–72 season, the Floridians split their home games between Miami and Tampa. They again finished in fourth place in the Eastern Division, with a record of 36–48. Once again the team made the playoffs and once again they lost their series, this time to the Virginia Squires, 4–0.

The Floridians' dreadful attendance for their two home playoff games against the Squires convinced Doyle that the team could not be viable in South Florida. After a deal to relocate to Cincinnati fell through, and attempts to find a bigger market turned up nil, he disbanded the franchise in June 1972. Big-time basketball wouldn't return to Florida until the NBA expansion team, the Miami Heat, played their first season in 1988. The Orlando Magic followed a year later.

The Heat franchise paid tribute to the Floridians franchise in recent years by wearing replicas of the 1970–71 Floridians home and away uniforms for several games in the 2005–06 and 2011–12 seasons as part of the NBA's "Hardwood Classics Night" program. However, the franchises are not linked in any way other than their respective connections to the city of Miami.

Basketball Hall of FamersNotes: 1 Inducted as a player.

Season-by-season

|-
|colspan="6" align=center style="background:#FF7518; color:#6699CC;"| Miami Floridians|-
|1968–69 || 43 || 35 || .551 || Won Division SemifinalsLost Division Finals || Miami 4, Minnesota 3Indiana 4, Miami 1
|-
|1969–70 || 23 || 61 ||.274|| colspan=2|Did not qualify  
|-
|colspan="6" align=center style="background:black; color:#FF0090; border:2px solid #FF8C00;"| The Floridians'''
|-
|1970–71 || 37 || 47 ||.440 || Lost Division Semifinals || Kentucky 4, The Floridians 2
|-
|1971–72 || 36 || 48 ||.429 || Lost Division Semifinals || Virginia 4, The Floridians 0

References

External links
Remembering the ABA: The Floridians
Miami Heat Floridians website

 
American Basketball Association teams
Defunct basketball teams in Florida
Basketball teams established in 1968
Basketball teams disestablished in 1972
1968 establishments in Florida
1972 disestablishments in Florida
Defunct basketball teams in the United States